This is a list of the complete squads for the 2016 Americas Rugby Championship, an annual rugby union tournament contested by Argentina XV, Brazil, Canada, Chile, United States and Uruguay. Argentina XV are the defending champions.

Note: Number of caps and players' ages are indicated as of 6 February 2016 – the tournament's opening day.

Argentina XV

On 22 January, acting head coach for the Argentina side Pablo Bouza, named a 26-man squad for the Championship.

1 On 30 January, Juan Pablo Estellés replaced Franco Cuaranta in the squad following an injury sustained in training.

2 On 4 February, Gaspar Baldunciel was added to the squad as injury cover for Facundo Bosch following injury sustained in training.

3 On 7 February, 12 further players were added to the squad.

4 On 16 February, Marcos Bollini, Juan Cruz González and Gonzalo Paulín were named a 24-man squad for training ahead of the Uruguay fixture.

5 On 25 February, Jaguars players Lucas González Amorosino and Juan Manuel Leguizamón were released by the Super Rugby side for game time, while Bautista Delguy and Tomás Granella joined the squad with the Sevens player returning to the national sevens team.

6 On 1 March, Martín Elías, Franco Molina and Patricio Baronio were called up to the squad for the final fixture against Brazil.

Head coach:  Pablo Bouza

Brazil

Brazil's 31-man squad for the Championship.

1 On 11 February, the uncapped Yan Machado was named in the side to face Uruguay haven not been named in the original 31-man squad.

2 On 18 February, Jonatas Paulo was called up to replace the Jardel Vettorato, who retired following the Uruguay fixture in round 2.

3 On 25 February, André Arruda, Diego López and Robert Tenório were called up to replace Cléber Dias, Mark Jackson and Lucas Muller.

4 On 1 March, Rafael Carnivalle and Matheus Cruz were called up to the squad, with Cruz entering the squad as an injury replacement for Stefano Giantorno.

Head Coach:  Rodolfo Ambrosio

Canada

On 26 January, Canada’s interim Senior Men’s head coach Francois Ratier, named a 28-man squad for the Championship.

1 Following the signing of Evan Olmstead to London Scottish post-squad announcement, Kyle Gilmour was called up to the squad as his replacement.

2 On 18 February, Joe Dolesau and Brock Staller were named in the team to face Brazil haven been called after the United States fixture.

Head coach:  Francois Ratier

Chile

Chile's 26-man squad for the Championship.

1 On 11 February, Felipe Bassaletti, Matthieu Manas and Nicolás Venegas were added to the squad ahead of the Argentine fixture.

2 On 18 February, Ińaki Gurruchaga was named in the squad ahead of the United States fixture.

3 On 26 February, Roberto Oyarzún was named in the squad ahead of the Uruguay fixture.

Head Coach:  Elías Santillán

United States

On 29 January, United States head coach John Mitchell, named a 37-man squad for the Championship.

1 On 9 February, Nate Brakeley and Aaron Davis were added to the squad ahead of the Canada fixture.

2 On 17 February, Lorenzo Thomas and Deion Mikesell were added to the squad ahead of the Chile fixture, haven impressed for the U20's team a week earlier.

3 On 25 February, James King and Andrew Suniula were added to the squad ahead of the South American matches against Brazil and Uruguay.

Head coach:  John Mitchell

Uruguay

Uruguay's initial 24-man squad for the Championship. Additional players will be added to the team throughout the Championship

1 On 8 February, Ignacio Dotti, Federico Favaro and the uncapped trio of Lukas Lacoste, Ignacio Secco and Martín Secco were called up ahead of the Brazil fixture.

2 On 17 February, Fernando Bascou, Facundo Klappenbach, Juan Diego Ormaechea and Andrés Rocco were named in the team to face Argentina in round 3.

Head Coach:  Esteban Meneses

References

2016 squads
Rugby union squads